This is a list of musicians and musical groups from Cameroon.

 Njacko Backo
 Blanche Bailly
 Francis Bebey
 Moni Bilé
 Diboué Black
 Richard Bona
 Les Têtes Brulées
 Daphne
 Manu Dibango
 Charlotte Dipanda
 Stanley Enow
 Jovi
 Michael Kiessou
 Mr. Leo
 Wes Madiko
 Magasco
 Bébé Manga
 Lapiro de Mbanga
 Coco Mbassi
 Yannick Noah
 Kristo Numpuby
 Sally Nyolo
 Petit Pays
 Lady Ponce
 Reniss
 Salatiel
 Sam Fan Thomas

 
Musicians
Cameroon